Heshmatabad or Hashmatabad may refer to:
 Heshmatabad, Fars
 Heshmatabad, Gilan
 Heshmatabad, Kerman
 Heshmatabad, Dorud, Lorestan Province
 Heshmatabad, Silakhor, Dorud County, Lorestan Province
 Heshmatabad, Torbat-e Heydarieh, Razavi Khorasan Province
 Heshmatabad, Zaveh, Razavi Khorasan Province
 Heshmatabad, Yazd
 Heshmatabad Rural District
 Heshmatabad, alternate name of Seyyed Heshmat